The Derways Automobile Company (ООО Автомобильная компания ДЕРВЕЙС) was a Russian automaker located in Cherkessk. The company was founded in 2003 as the first private car manufacturer of Russia and as a part of the Russian Mercury Group. Since June 2007 the company is building 100,000 units for the local market within a joint venture with the Chinese firms Lifan Group and Liaoning SG Automotive Group Co., Ltd. The second plant of Derways was opened in the fall 2009. About 3,000 workers were employed by Derways.

Former Models

Derways Cowboy (2004–2007, SUV to rival the Mercedes-Benz G-Class, based on ARO chassis)

Derways Land Crown (since 2006, a rebadged Chinese copy version of the Toyota Land Cruiser Prado 90 Series)
Derways Aurora (since 2006, rebadged Huanghai Aurora)
Derways Shuttle (since 2006, rebadged Dadi Shuttle/Gonow Jetstar/Huanghai Challenger)
Derways Antelope (since 2007, a rebadged Gonow FAN/Troy)
Derways Plutus (since 2007, Pickup; a rebadged Huanghai Plutus, a copy of the Ssangyong Rexton )
Geely MK Cross (2011–present)
Geely Emgrand (2012–present)
Great Wall Hover (2010–present)
Lifan Smily (since 2007)
Lifan Solano (since 2007)
Lifan Breeze (2007–2012)
Derways Saladin (since 2008, a rebadged version of the Nissan Paladin/Roniz)
Geely MK (2010–2018)

See also
 TagAZ, a similar but now defunct Russian company.

References

External links
Official website

Car manufacturers of Russia
Vehicle manufacturing companies established in 2003
Russian brands
Companies based in Karachay-Cherkessia